Kibiwott Kandie (born 20 June 1996) is a Kenyan long-distance runner. In December 2020, he won the Valencia Half Marathon finishing in a new world record time of 57:32, chopping off the previous world record by almost 30 seconds. Kandie won the silver medal in the men's race at the 2020 World Athletics Half Marathon Championships.

Career

2020
In 2020, Kibiwott Kandie won the Ras Al Khaimah Half Marathon held in Ras Al Khaimah, United Arab Emirates. He also won the Prague 21.1 km event at the Prague Half Marathon held in Prague, Czech Republic. This was an invitation-only half marathon for elite runners. This event was held after the Prague Half Marathon was cancelled due to the COVID-19 pandemic.

In December 2020, at the Valencia Half Marathon, Kandie set a new half marathon world record with a time of 57:32, obliterating the previous record set by Geoffrey Kamworor by almost half a minute.

2021
On 4 April 2021, he set a course record of 59:32 at the Istanbul Half Marathon in Turkey. On 3 October, Kandie raced at The Giants Geneva 10k, where he won the race in 26:51.

Achievements

International competitions

Personal bests
 10,000 metres – 27:20.34 (Birmingham 2022)
 20,000 metres – 57:07.41 (Brussels 2022)
 One hour run – 20,940 m (Brussels 2022)
Road
 10 kilometres – 26:50 (Herzogenaurach 2022)
 Half marathon – 57:32 (Valencia 2020) 
 Marathon – 2:13:43 (New York, NY 2021)

References

External links
 

Living people
1996 births
Place of birth missing (living people)
Kenyan male long-distance runners
Athletes (track and field) at the 2022 Commonwealth Games
Commonwealth Games bronze medallists for Kenya
Commonwealth Games medallists in athletics
21st-century Kenyan people
Medallists at the 2022 Commonwealth Games